Jumble may be used as:

 Jumble, the word game.
 Jumble (British game show), a game show adaption based on the word game
 Jumble algorithm, solving and creating clues seen in the word game
 Jumble (cookie), the widespread travel cookie also known as knots
 Jumble sale, a variation on the term "rummage sale"